Haunts is the debut album by the Arizona-based indie rock project, Bark Bark Bark. It was released through Retard Disco and Southern Records on May 22, 2007.

Track listing
All songs were written by Jacob Cooper, except where noted.

 "Brand New Shoes" – 1:52
 "Haunts" – 3:06
 "Some Time" – 2:42
 "One Thing Stands" (Jacob Cooper, Michael Fay) – 3:28
 "Tattoos" (Cooper, Fay) – 2:56
 "New Kids on the Block" – 3:06
 "I'm Needy" – 2:35
 "GTFO" – 2:23
 "Pluto Never Forget" – 1:44
 "I Love You but I Don't" (Cooper, Fay) – 3:56
 "Heart" – 2:26
 "How to Save a Whale" – 1:31
 "Dead Ghost" – 2:03
 "You Could Swim" – 2:47

Personnel
 Jacob Cooper – vocals, sequencing, guitar, drums
 Johnnie Munger – sequencing, backing vocals
 Michael Sanger – backing vocals
 Ashley Thomas – backing vocals

References

External links
 

2007 debut albums